Phoebe Kanyange is a Rwandan politician, currently a member of the Chamber of Deputies in the Parliament of Rwanda. In September 2016 she replaced Christine Mukabunani as spokesperson of the National Consultative Forum of Political Organisations.

References 

21st-century Rwandan women politicians
21st-century Rwandan politicians
Members of the Chamber of Deputies (Rwanda)
Living people
Year of birth missing (living people)